Orleana Hawks Puckett was an American midwife in the mountains of Patrick and Carroll County, Virginia. Although never documented, it is said she helped deliver more than 1,000 babies, and never lost a mother or a child. In 2012, Puckett was posthumously honored as one of the Library of Virginia's "Virginia Women in History".

Life
Puckett served as a midwife from 1889 until 1938, a year before she died. She started being a midwife after she herself had lost 24 children. Reasons for these deaths are unclear; some say she or her husband murdered them, but a more likely reason is that she had a disease that affected the baby, like Rh hemolytic disease. Most of her children were stillborn, and if they did live, they only survived for a few days. Even though she was unable successfully to have children, or maybe because of that, she decided to assist her neighbors in Carroll County during childbirth. She was almost 50 years old when she started her “practice”, on a completely voluntarily basis. The last delivery she assisted was that of Maxwell Hawks, on August 30, 1938.

Name
Since Puckett herself was illiterate, the spelling of her first name is uncertain. In 1913, when she applied for a pension because her husband had served in the Confederate Army, the notary filled in "Orleana". Some of the different names are Orlean, Orlena, Aulina or even Pauline.

Legacy
Her last home was a tiny one-room wood cabin hardly larger than an average dining room; it has been preserved by the National Park Service and may be seen along the Blue Ridge Parkway at mile 189.9.

The Orelena Hawks Puckett Institute in Asheville, North Carolina continues her legacy to care for mother and child. They promote and try to strengthen the development of child, parents, and family.

In 2018 the Virginia Capitol Foundation announced that Puckett's name would be included on the Virginia Women's Monument's glass Wall of Honor.

References

External links
Puckett's biography at the Library of Virginia

1844 births
American midwives
People from Patrick County, Virginia
1938 deaths
People from Carroll County, Virginia